The Plantin-Moretus Museum is a printing museum in Antwerp, Belgium which focuses on the work of the 16th-century printers Christophe Plantin and Jan Moretus. It is located in their former residence and printing establishment, the Plantin Press, at the Vrijdagmarkt (Friday Market) in Antwerp, and has been a UNESCO World Heritage Site since 2005.

History 
The printing company was founded in the 16th century by Christophe Plantin, who obtained type from the leading typefounders of the day in Paris. Plantin was a major figure in contemporary printing with interests in humanism; his eight-volume, multi-language Plantin Polyglot Bible with Hebrew, Aramaic, Greek and Syriac texts was one of the most complex productions of the period. Plantin's is now suspected of being at least connected to members of heretical groups known as the Familists, and this may have led him to spend time in exile in his native France.

After Plantin's death it was owned by his son-in-law Jan Moretus. While most printing concerns disposed of their collections of older type in the eighteenth and nineteenth century in response to changing tastes, the Plantin-Moretus company "piously preserved the collection of its founder."

Four women ran the family-owned Plantin-Moretus printing house (Plantin Press) over the 16th, 17th, and 18th centuries: Martina Plantin, Anna Goos, Anna Maria de Neuf and Maria Theresia Borrekens. 

In 1876 Edward Moretus sold the company to the city of Antwerp. One year later the public could visit the living areas and the printing presses. The collection has been used extensively for research, by historians H. D. L. Vervliet, Mike Parker and Harry Carter. Carter's son Matthew would later describe this research as helping to demonstrate "that the finest collection of printing types made in typography's golden age was in perfect condition (some muddle aside) [along with] Plantin's accounts and inventories which names the cutters of his types."

In 2002 the museum was nominated as UNESCO World Heritage Site and in 2005 was inscribed onto the World Heritage list.

The Plantin-Moretus Museum possesses an exceptional collection of typographical material. Not only does it house the two oldest surviving printing presses in the world 
and complete sets of dies and matrices, it also has an extensive library, a richly decorated interior and the entire archives of the Plantin business, which were inscribed on UNESCO's Memory of the World Programme Register in 2001 in recognition of their historical significance.

Collection 

 a Bible in five languages: Biblia Polyglotta (1568-1573)
 Thesaurus Teutoniae Linguae by Cornelis Kiliaan
 a geographical book: Theatrum Orbis Terrarum made by Abraham Ortelius
 a book describing herbs: Cruydeboeck made by Rembert Dodoens
 an anatomical book made by Andreas Vesalius and Joannes Valverde
 a book about decimal numbers from Simon Stevin
 a 36-line Bible
 paintings and drawings by Peter Paul Rubens
 the study of humanist Justus Lipsius and many of his works
 some of the materials used by French type designer and printer Robert Granjon

See also

 List of museums in Belgium
 Renaissance humanism in Northern Europe
 Max Rooses

References

Bibliography

External links 

Museum Plantin-Moretus
Plantin-Moretus House-Workshops-Museum Complex UNESCO Collection on Google Arts and Culture
Pictures from the museum
A review of the Plantin-Moretus Museum

World Heritage Sites in Belgium
Museums in Antwerp
Printing press museums
Biographical museums in Belgium
Historic house museums in Belgium
Houses in Belgium
Museums established in 1877
1877 establishments in Belgium
Art museums and galleries in Belgium